The Chester & Connah's Quay Railway ran from Chester Northgate in Chester, Cheshire, England to Shotton, Flintshire, Wales. It was in use for its full length from 1890 to 1992.

At Dee Marsh Junction it connected with the North Wales and Liverpool Railway. It then crossed the River Dee by means of Hawarden Bridge before joining the Wrexham, Mold and Connah's Quay Railway at Shotton.

The line today

Open portion
The only section of the Chester & Connah's Quay Railway which remains in use is between Dee Marsh Junction and Shotton, forming part of the Borderlands Line.

Closed portion
The rest of the line closed to passenger trains in 1968, but remained open to freight trains until 1992.  Even though steelmaking operations at the British Steel plant at Shotton ceased in March 1980, freight continued to use the double-tracked line until 20 April 1984. Goods services resumed on a single-track line on 31 August 1986 before final closure in June 1992. This was precipitated by the closure of Ravenscraig steelworks in Motherwell, Scotland, as freight trains using the line ran between Ravenscraig and Shotton rolling mill.

Cycle path
Since the line between Chester and Dee Marsh closed, the track has been lifted and the route is now a cycle path, forming part of Route 5 of the National Cycle Network.

Junction maps

References

External links

 Images of the line in its final operating days
 National Cycle Network Chester to Connah's Quay
 Railscot article on the Chester & Connah's Quay Railway
 Virtual stroll along the railway

Great Central Railway
Closed railway lines in North West England
Early British railway companies
Railway lines opened in 1890
Standard gauge railways in England
Early Welsh railway companies